Schooling is a surname. Notable people with the surname include:

 Elisabeth Schooling (1915–1998), British ballet dancer
 Herbert W. Schooling (1912–1987), American educator
 Joseph Schooling (born 1995), Singaporean swimmer
 William Schooling (1860–1936), British insurance expert